Jeanne-Élisabeth Le Clerc Soligny (née Malter, 1749), known also under her stage name Elisabeth Le Clerc, was a French ballet mistress and ballerina. She was a premier dancer at the French Ballet of the Du Londel Troupe in Sweden and of the Royal Swedish Ballet.

Le Clerc was employed at the Ballet of the French Theatre in Sweden, where she debuted in 1764. She was admired for her beauty, talent and grace. She was also known for her affairs with Arvid Horn and Henrik Johan von Düben. She was soon noted as one of the stars of the ballet and was appointed premier dancer and ballet mistress. She married the actor Pierre-Claude Soligny from the same theatre in 1770.

In 1771, the French Theatre was dissolved. When the Royal Swedish Ballet was founded in 1773, however, there were not yet enough Swedish dancers and many of the first members of this troupe consisted of dancers from the old French Ballet troupe. The most prominent of these dancers were Louis Gallodier, Ninon Dubois Le Clerc, Louis Frossard and Marie-Renée Frossard and Elisabeth Soligny; Soligny was Gallodier's dance partner in the ballets. She lost her position in the ballet in 1782, at the age of 33.

See also 
 Sophie Daguin
 Marguerite Morel

References

Further reading
 Forser, Tomas & Heed, Sven Åke (red.), Ny svensk teaterhistoria. 1, Teater före 1800, Gidlund, Hedemora, 2007 
 Jonsson, Leif & Ivarsdotter, Anna (red.), Musiken i Sverige. 2, Frihetstid och gustaviansk tid 1720-1810, Fischer, Stockholm, 1993 (Music in Sweden. The age of Liberty and the Gustavian age 1720–1810) 
 Löfgren, Lars, Svensk teater, Natur och kultur, Stockholm, 2003

External links
 Cesar.org.uk:  

French ballerinas
Swedish ballerinas
18th-century French ballet dancers
Ballet mistresses
French ballet masters
1749 births
Year of death missing
Gustavian era people
Royal Swedish Ballet dancers
Court of Gustav III